Ga-Lamola, also known as Rosenkrantz Farm, is a sparsely populated village in Ga-Matlala in the Blouberg Local Municipality of the Capricorn District Municipality of the Limpopo province of South Africa. It is located 73 km northwest of Polokwane and 32 km southeast of Senwabarwana.

Education 
Rozenkrantz Primary School.
Mokateng Secondary School.

Health 
Rozenkrantz Clinic.

Sports 
Football is the most popular sport in Ga-Lamola.
Selata F.C.
Ditlou F.C.

References 

Populated places in the Blouberg Local Municipality